Ornithinibacillus scapharcae is a Gram-positive, aerobic, hemolytic, spore-forming and motile bacterium from the genus of Ornithinibacillus which has been isolated from a dead ark clam from the Gang-jin Bay in Korea.

References

External links 

Type strain of Ornithinibacillus scapharcae at BacDive -  the Bacterial Diversity Metadatabase

Bacillaceae
Bacteria described in 2012